Wayne Ferreira was the defending champion, but lost in the first round to Anders Järryd.

Jim Courier won the title by defeating Jan Siemerink 6–7(2–7), 7–6(7–5), 5–7, 6–2, 7–5 in the final.

Seeds

Draw

Finals

Top half

Bottom half

References

External links
 Official results archive (ATP)
 Official results archive (ITF)

1995 ATP Tour
1995 in Swiss tennis
1995 Davidoff Swiss Indoors